The  Clarke Observatory  is located on the Mount Union College campus in Alliance, Ohio.

History
Originally built for private use, the observatory was sold to Elmer Harrold, another private owner, who donated to Mount Union College upon the graduation of his daughter from the college.  A new observatory was built on campus to house the observatory in 1923 and outfitted with the telescope from the first Clarke Observatory.  The second observatory was demolished in 1969 and the telescope moved to a new home attached to East Hall at Mount Union College.

Observatories
First Observatory
Location:  Dunkirk, New York
Construction Began:  1897
Benefactor:  Charles Ezra Hequembourg
Telescope Mounted:  1897, German equatorial
First Telescope:  George N. Saegmuller 9-inch refractor, 117-inch focal length
First Light:  1897?
Dome Material:  bronze
Directors:
Charles Ezra Hequembourg, private owner (1897-1907)
Mrs. Hequembourg, private owner (1907-1914)

Second Observatory
Location:  Alliance, Ohio
Construction Began:  1923
Benefactor:  Elmer Harrold
Telescope Mounted:  ?
First Telescope:  George N. Saegmuller 9-inch refractor, 117-inch focal length, moved from New York
Directors:
Elmer Harrold, private owner (1917-1919), donated to Mount Union College

Third Observatory
Location:  Alliance, Ohio
Construction Began:  1969
Refinished:  1952, by the Alliance Tool Company
Telescope Mounted:  1969
First Telescope:  9-inch Saegmuller, refurbished with 8.5-inch lens with 135-inch focal length by J. W. Fecker Company of Pittsburgh.
Directors:
James P. Rodman

See also
 List of astronomical observatories

References

External links
Clarke Observatory Telescope History

Astronomical observatories in Ohio
Alliance, Ohio
University of Mount Union
Buildings and structures in Stark County, Ohio